Lawrence Bennett Gottlieb (born June 10, 1951, Jackson Heights, New York, United States) is an American songwriter.

Gottlieb has penned songs for Trisha Yearwood, Kim Richey and Kevin Montgomery, as well as penning Blue Öyster Cult's "Dancin' in the Ruins" with Jason Scanlon. The song came to BÖC through the publisher, and was recorded for "Club Ninja." Gottlieb has been nominated for two Grammy Awards: the first in 1982 (with Marc Blatte) for Best R&B Song, with "When She Was My Girl", performed by the Four Tops, and the second in 1997 (with Angelo Petraglia and Kim Richey) for Best Country Song, with "Believe Me Baby (I Lied)", performed by Trisha Yearwood.

Discography

Songwriting

References

External links
[ Larry Gottlieb] – Allmusic artist entry

Living people
1951 births
American country songwriters
American male songwriters
Jewish American songwriters
Songwriters from New York (state)
People from Jackson Heights, Queens
People from Manhasset, New York
21st-century American Jews